A by-election was held for the New South Wales Legislative Assembly electorate of Ryde on 23 January 1904 because of the resignation of Frank Farnell who had been appointed Chairman of the Fisheries Board.

Dates

Result

Frank Farnell resigned.

See also
Electoral results for the district of Ryde
List of New South Wales state by-elections

Notes

References

1904 elections in Australia
New South Wales state by-elections
1900s in New South Wales